Kathleen Joan Reichs (née  Toelle, born 1950) is an American crime writer, forensic anthropologist and academic. She is an adjunct professor of anthropology at the University of North Carolina at Charlotte. She is well-known for inspiring the television series Bones.

Early life and education
Kathleen Joan Toelle was born in 1950 in Chicago, Illinois.

She earned her Bachelor of Arts degree with a major in anthropology from American University in 1971.  In 1972, she completed her Master of Arts in physical anthropology at Northwestern University, where, in 1975, she completed her PhD, also in physical anthropology.

Academia and anthropology
Since 1975, Reichs has taught at Northern Illinois University, University of Pittsburgh, Concordia University, and McGill University, and currently holds a position as adjunct professor of anthropology at the University of North Carolina at Charlotte. In the past, Kathy Reichs has consulted for the Office of the Chief Medical Examiner in North Carolina.

Reichs has appeared in Tanzania to testify at the United Nations's International Criminal Tribunal for Rwanda.  She has assisted Clyde Snow and the Foundation for Guatemalan Forensic Anthropology in an exhumation in the area of Lake Atitlan in the highlands of southwest Guatemala.  She was a member of the Disaster Mortuary Operational Response Team assigned to assist at the World Trade Center disaster.

She is one of 100 anthropologists certified by the American Board of Forensic Anthropology and is on the board of directors of the American Academy of Forensic Sciences.  She is also affiliated with the Laboratoire des Sciences Judiciaires et de Médecine Légale for the province of Quebec.

Fiction
In addition to technical books, as of January 2019, Reichs has written 21 novels, which have been translated into 30 languages.  20 of those novels constitute the "Temperance Brennan" series. Her first novel, Déjà Dead, won the 1997 Arthur Ellis Award for Best First Novel.

The fictional heroine in her novels, Temperance "Tempe" Brennan, is also a forensic anthropologist.  Her lifestyle closely mimics that of her creator, with Reichs stating that Brennan and she "have the same CV" and that "Some of Tempe's personality traits are also mine," but there are differences in their personal lives, such as the character's alcoholism.  A good portion of the novels are based on real life science, and Reichs has stated that she is "fastidiously conscientious about getting the science right."
 She has used experience from her career in her novels and said about Déjà Dead that "Everything I describe in the book, I actually did." In the novel Grave Secrets, she uses her experience from her visit to Guatemala.

She has also written the young adult novels series named Virals, centered on Tempe's great-niece, Tory Brennan, and a pack of her friends, Ben, Hiram, Shelton, and wolfdog Cooper.

A stand-alone novel, Two Nights, published July 11, 2017, features Sunday Night, a tough-talking, scarred heroine.

Television 

The 2005 Fox television series Bones is inspired by Reichs' life and novels. The series borrows the name of her books' heroine, Temperance "Bones" Brennan. As in the books, Brennan (Emily Deschanel) is a forensic anthropologist; however, there are many differences: the television character is younger, more socially awkward, and is based in the Jeffersonian, a fictionalized version of the Smithsonian Institution in Washington, D.C. Additionally, the TV-Brennan moonlights as an author, writing about a fictional forensic anthropologist named Kathy Reichs. Aside from the character's name and occupation, there are few similarities between the TV show and the novels.

Reichs works as a producer on the show to "keep the science honest". She appeared in the second-season episode "Judas on a Pole", playing Professor Constance Wright, a forensic anthropologist on the Jeffersonian's board of trustees who conducts Zack Addy's dissertation defense. 

Reichs wrote the season five episode, "The Witch in the Wardrobe," the season nine episode, "The Dude in the Dam," and wrote the season eleven episode, "The Stiff in the Cliff" with her daughter Kerry.

Casey Anthony murder trial

In 2011, Reichs was an expert witness in the Casey Anthony murder trial. Reichs was reluctant to get involved, but later agreed and performed a full skeletal analysis of Anthony's daughter, Caylee, but could not determine a cause of death.  She concluded that there was no evidence of abuse and that the child appeared to be well-nourished.

Personal life
Reichs has two daughters, Kerry and Courtney, and a son, Brendan.

Selected works

Academic papers

Academic books

Temperance Brennan series

Stand-alone books

Virals series
This series was co-authored by Reich's son, Brendan Reichs. Tory Brennan, the great niece of Temperance Brennan, is the titular character of this series.

Novellas
Reichs has released six downloadable short stories:

References

External links

Kathy Reichs: Turning a lifelong career into writing success at Jarrah Loh.com
Kathy Reichs Interview Shots Ezine October 2012
EBc-KReichs Kathy Reichs in Encyclopedia Britannica

20th-century American novelists
21st-century American novelists
American forensic scientists
University of North Carolina at Charlotte faculty
American mystery writers
Television producers from Illinois
American women television producers
American University alumni
Forensic anthropologists
Northwestern University alumni
Women mystery writers
Writers from Chicago
1950 births
Living people
American women novelists
Women forensic scientists
Canadian women scientists
20th-century American women scientists
21st-century American women scientists
Members of the Order of Canada
Novelists from Illinois
20th-century American women writers
21st-century American women writers
American women anthropologists
Canadian women anthropologists
Bones (TV series)